De Schreeuw (The Scream) is a sculpture in the Oosterpark in Amsterdam that commemorates the assassinated Dutch film-maker Theo van Gogh. The monument was designed by Jeroen Henneman as a symbol of freedom of speech.

Background
Theo van Gogh was assassinated on 2 November 2004  in the Linnaeusstraat in Amsterdam, just a few steps away from the Oosterpark. The assassin was Mohammed Bouyeri. In 2007 Henneman created the sculpture as symbol of freedom of speech.

History
The work shows the tension and complexity of the theme of freedom of expression and how Van Gogh was silenced.

The designer, Jeroen Henneman, said on the occasion of the unveiling that he hopes the image will remind passers-by of the moment of the murder; "to Theo van Gogh, who cries out for mercy."

See also
List of outdoor sculptures in the Netherlands

References

De Schreeuw
2007 sculptures
Buildings and structures in Amsterdam
De Schreeuw
De Schreeuw
De Schreeuw
Sculptures in Amsterdam